Trey is a given name, as well as a nickname for people with the name suffix III. Notable people with the name include:

Given name or nickname
Trey Adams (born 1997), American football player
Trey Anastasio (born 1964), American musician
Trey Anthony (born 1974), Canadian comedian and playwright
Trey Ball (born 1994), American baseball player
Trey Beamon (born 1974), American baseball player
Trey Brewer, American bodybuilder
Trey Bruce, American songwriter
Trey Burke (born 1992), American basketball player
Trey Ellis (born 1962), American novelist, screenwriter, professor, playwright, and essayist
Trey Flowers (born 1993), American football player
Trey Gowdy (born 1964), U.S. congressman from South Carolina
Trey Grayson (born 1972), former Secretary of State of Kentucky
Trey Griffey (born 1994), American football player
Trey Gunn (born 1960), American musician
Trey Hardee (born 1984), American decathlete
Trey Hendrickson (born 1994), American football player
Trey Hill (born 2000), American football player
Trey Hillman (born 1963), American baseball manager
Trey Hodges (born 1978), American baseball player
Trey Hutchens (born 1998), American race car driver
Trey Johnson (born 1984), American basketball player
Trey Junkin (born 1961), American football player
Trey Lance (born 2000), American football player
Trey Lewis (disambiguation), multiple people
Trey Lorenz (born 1969), American singer and songwriter
Trey Lyles (born 1995), Canadian basketball player
Trey Marshall (born 1996), American football player
Trey McBride (born 1999), American football player
Trey Moore (born 1972), retired Major League Baseball pitcher
Trey Palmer (born 2001), American football player
Trey Parker (born 1969), American actor and comedian
Trey Pipkins (born 1996), American football player
Trey Quinn (born 1995), American football player
Trey Radel (born 1976), American politician
Trey Ragas (born 1996), American football player
Trey Sermon (born 1999), American football player
Trey Smith (disambiguation), multiple people
Trey Spruance (born 1969), American composer, producer, and musician
Trey Teague (born 1974), American football player
Trey Thompkins (born 1990), American basketball player
Trey Waltke (born 1955), American tennis player
Trey Wingo (born 1963), American sportscaster
Trey Williams (born 1992), American football player

Stage name
 Trey Azagthoth, guitarist for death metal band Morbid Angel
 Trey Songz (born 1984), American R&B singer, songwriter, record producer, rapper, and actor Tremaine "Trey" Neverson
 MC Trey, also known as Trey, Fijian-Australian vocalist, and hip-hop activist

Fictional characters
 Trey, a hacker in the film Live Free or Die Hard
 Trey of Triforia, in Power Rangers: Zeo
 Trey Atwood, in the TV series The O.C.
 Trey Racer, in Shaman King; see List of Shaman King characters
 Trey Clover, in Disney Twisted-Wonderland

See also
Tray (given name)
Trae, given name
Tre (given name)

English masculine given names